Sanjayan Thuraisingam (born 11 September 1969) is a Tamil Canadian cricketer. He is a right-handed batsman and a right-arm fast medium bowler.

Thuraisingam was Canada's top wicket-taker at the 2001 ICC Trophy and his 5 wickets for just 25 runs brought Canada's cricket team to the World Cup on 17 July 2001. He played three matches in the 2003 Cricket World Cup, and has since played a further six One Day Internationals for Canada. He has also represented them in two ICC Intercontinental Cup matches and the 2005 ICC Trophy.

References

External links
at CricketArchive 
Sanjayam Thuraisingam at ESPNcricinfo

1969 births
Canadian cricketers
Canada One Day International cricketers
Canada Twenty20 International cricketers
Cricketers at the 1998 Commonwealth Games
Living people
Sri Lankan Tamil sportspeople
Tamil sportspeople
Canadian people of Sri Lankan Tamil descent
Canadian Hindus
Canadian sportspeople of Sri Lankan descent
Cricketers from Colombo
Sri Lankan cricketers
Commonwealth Games competitors for Canada